Duchacek Will Fix It is a Czech comedy film directed by Karel Lamač. It was released in 1938.

The film is a remake of the German comedy The Office Manager (1931).

Cast
 Vlasta Burian - Jan Damián Ducháček
 Ladislav Hemmer - Dr. Jiří Faukner - advokát
 Adina Mandlová - Julie z Rispaldic
 Milada Gampeová - Alžběta z Rispaldic
 Čeněk Šlégl - Quido Krystofovic - korvetní kapitán
 Karel Máj - Ervín z Rispaldic
 Václav Trégl - Jan Rabas
 Marie Blažková - Brigita Rabasová
 Theodor Pištěk - Ignác Zámoský - bankéř
 Jiřina Sedláčková - Helena Bertrandová
 Jaroslav Marvan - Baron Kurt Bertrand, advokát
 Karel Postranecký - Vilém - komorník
 Karel Němec - Dudek - kastelán
 Ferdinand Jarkovský - Kolomazník - koncipient
 Milka Balek-Brodská - Faukner's Secretary

External links
 

1938 films
1938 comedy films
Czech comedy films
Films directed by Karel Lamač
Czech black-and-white films
Remakes of German films
1930s Czech films